Iva Budařová and Sandra Wasserman were the defending champions but did not compete that year.

Jana Novotná and Tine Scheuer-Larsen won in the final 6–2, 2–6, 7–6 against Arantxa Sánchez and Judith Wiesner.

Seeds
Champion seeds are indicated in bold text while text in italics indicates the round in which those seeds were eliminated.

 Jana Novotná /  Tine Scheuer-Larsen (champions)
 Helen Kelesi /  Catherine Suire (semifinals)
 Arantxa Sánchez /  Judith Wiesner (final)
 Sophie Amiach /  Alexia Dechaume (semifinals)

Draw

External links
 ITF tournament edition details

Doubles